Mitchell W. Wood, better known as Booty Wood (December 27, 1919 – June 10, 1987) was an American jazz trombonist.

Career 
Wood played professionally on trombone from the late 1930s. He worked with Tiny Bradshaw and Lionel Hampton in the 1940s before joining the Navy during World War II. While there he played in a band with Clark Terry, Willie Smith, and Gerald Wilson. After his service ended he returned to play with Hampton, then worked with Arnett Cobb (1947–48), Erskine Hawkins (1948-50), and Count Basie (1951).

He spent a few years outside music, then played with Duke Ellington in 1959-60 and again in 1963; he returned once more early in the 1970s. He again played with the Count Basie Orchestra from 1979 into the middle of the following decade.

Discography

As leader
 Chelsea Bridge (Black and Blue, 1998)

As sideman
With Count Basie
 Digital III at Montreux with Ella Fitzgerald, Joe Pass (Pablo, 1979) – first two tracks only
 Kansas City Shout (Pablo, 1980)
 On the Road (Pablo, 1980)
 Warm Breeze (Pablo, 1981)
 Farmer's Market Barbecue (Pablo, 1982)
 88 Basie Street (Pablo, 1984)
 Fancy Pants (Pablo, 1987)

With Duke Ellington
 Blues in Orbit (Columbia, 1960)
 Swinging Suites by Edward E. and Edward G. (Columbia, 1960)
 The Nutcracker Suite (Columbia, 1960)
 Piano in the Background (CBS, 1962)
 My People (Contact, 1964)
 New Orleans Suite (Atlantic, 1971)
 The London Concert (United Artists, 1972)
 Memorial (CBS, 1974)
 The Afro-Eurasian Eclipse (Fantasy, 1975)
 The Ellington Suites (Pablo, 1976)
 Hot Summer Dance (Red Baron, 1991)

With Ella Fitzgerald
 A Perfect Match with the Count Basie Orchestra (Pablo, 1980)
 A Classy Pair with the Count Basie Orchestra (Pablo, 1982)

With others
 Harry Carney, Rock Me Gently (Metronome, 1961)
 Arnett Cobb, Arnett Blows for 1300 (Delmark, 1994)
 Paul Gonsalves, Ellingtonia Moods and Blues (RCA, 1971)
 Johnny Hodges, The Smooth One (Verve, 1979)
 Norris Turney, I Let a Song... (Black and Blue, 1978)
 Sarah Vaughan, Send in the Clowns (Pablo, 1981)

References

1919 births
1987 deaths
Musicians from Dayton, Ohio
American jazz trombonists
Male trombonists
20th-century American musicians
20th-century trombonists
Jazz musicians from Ohio
20th-century American male musicians
American male jazz musicians
United States Navy personnel of World War II